Anders Michelsen (born 27 September 1970) is a retired Norwegian football midfielder.

He started his career in Langhus IL, and joined Drøbak/Frogn ahead of the 1990 season. He played for SFK Lyn in 1993, and then rejoined Drøbak/Frogn. In 1996, he played for Skeid in the Norwegian Premier League. Ahead of the 2008 season he joined Strømsgodset IF. This was the first time that he played for another club than his twin brother Thomas. After some years for Strømsgodset he joined Follo. Having helped win promotion to the First Division, he planned to retire after the 2004 season, but played one final season for Langhus.

References

1970 births
Living people
Norwegian footballers
Lyn Fotball players
Skeid Fotball players
Strømsgodset Toppfotball players
Follo FK players
People from Ski, Norway
Drøbak-Frogn IL players
Norwegian twins
Eliteserien players
Twin sportspeople
Association football midfielders
Sportspeople from Viken (county)